Trygvi Askham (born 28 March 1988) is a Faroese footballer who plays as a goalkeeper for B36 Tórshavn and the Faroe Islands national team.

Career
Askham made his international debut for the Faroe Islands on 22 March 2018 in a friendly against Latvia. He came on as a half-time substitute for Teitur Gestsson, with the match in Marbella finishing as a 1–1 draw.

Career statistics

International

References

External links
 
 
 

1988 births
Living people
Faroese footballers
Faroe Islands youth international footballers
Faroe Islands under-21 international footballers
Faroe Islands international footballers
Association football goalkeepers
Faroese expatriate footballers
Expatriate men's footballers in Denmark
07 Vestur players
FC Hoyvík players
B36 Tórshavn players
EB/Streymur players
Faroe Islands Premier League players
1. deild
2. deild players